Aprominta gloriosa is a moth of the family Autostichidae. It is found in Greece.

References

Moths described in 1959
Aprominta
Moths of Europe